Jean Van Den Bosch (5 August 1898, Brussels – 1 July 1985, Sint-Jans-Molenbeek) was a cyclist from  Belgium. He won the silver medal in the Team Road race and a bronze medal in the Team Pursuit for Men at the 1924 Summer Olympics in Paris.

References

1898 births
1985 deaths
Belgian male cyclists
Cyclists at the 1924 Summer Olympics
Olympic cyclists of Belgium
Olympic silver medalists for Belgium
Olympic bronze medalists for Belgium
Olympic medalists in cycling
Cyclists from Brussels
Medalists at the 1924 Summer Olympics